Hopewell is an unincorporated community in Howard County, Maryland, United States. It lies at an elevation of 361 feet (110 m). The name is derived from the Laswells' Hopewell 200 acre original land tract patented on Dec. 6, 1728 for Thomas Davis.

See also
Owen Brown, Columbia, Maryland

References

Unincorporated communities in Howard County, Maryland
Unincorporated communities in Maryland